Omar Marrufo Rodríguez (born July 2, 1993, in Cozumel, Quintana Roo) is a Mexican professional footballer who plays as a forward for Veracruz.

External links
 
 

Living people
1993 births
Mexican footballers
Association football forwards
C.D. Veracruz footballers
Atlético San Luis footballers
Atlante F.C. footballers
Club Necaxa footballers
Club Puebla players
Lobos BUAP footballers
Liga MX players
Ascenso MX players
People from Cozumel
Footballers from Quintana Roo